Astoria Sanitarium, also referred to as , was a private hospital owned by Dr. John F. Daly.

History
A medical facility in Queens, NY named Astoria Hospital closed in 1898, and in 1910 "several former doctors from the Hospital attempted to revive Astoria Hospital, but they were unsuccessful." A 1925 attempt, using the name Daly's Astoria Sanitorium, operating as " a private sanatorium
and maternity hospital" succeeded.

Astoria General Hospital
"A group of physicians purchased the hospital in 1949 and changed its name to Astoria General Hospital; this was 32 years after Dr. Daly had finished Fordham Medical School. In 1993, Astoria General affiliated with Mount Sinai. With some fund raising, they expanded and relocated.

At their new location they became  and subsequently .

Controversy
The New York Daily News published a story regarding a resident of Astoria Sanitarium, and her husband, the sanitarium's owner, who were key parties in attempts to unravel the murder of a police officer.

References

External links
 Court of Appeals, Daly's Astoria Sanitarium vs. McNeil Blair, a case involving liability of a hospital for injuries to patients

  

Defunct hospitals in Queens
History of Queens, New York